Scopalinidae is an family of demosponges in the subclass Heteroscleromorpha. It is  the only family in the monotypic order Scopalinida.

References

External links 
 

Heteroscleromorpha
Sponge orders